Mihai Cosmin Răduț (born 18 March 1990) is a Romanian professional footballer who plays as a midfielder for Liga I club FC Voluntari.

Răduț started out at Internațional Curtea de Argeș in 2009, and one year later earned a transfer to Steaua București. He also represented Pandurii Târgu Jiu, Astra Giurgiu and Voluntari in his native country, while abroad he featured for Hatta Club, Lech Poznań and Aris Limassol.

Internationally, Răduț made his full debut for Romania in a 2–3 friendly loss to Ukraine in May 2010.

Club career
Răduț made his professional debut for Internațional Curtea de Argeș on 31 August 2009, in a 1–0 Liga I loss to Oțelul Galați. He ended his debut season with four goals from 26 appearances. 

On 17 June 2010, Răduț was transferred to FC Steaua București for a rumoured fee of €1 million. He registered his debut in a 2–1 league defeat of Universitatea Cluj, on 25 July 2010.

International career
Răduț represented Romania at and under-19 and under-21 levels, before earning his senior debut in a 2–3 friendly loss to Ukraine in Lviv, on 29 May 2010.

Personal life
Răduț's father, Valentin, was also a professional footballer. He played in the top flight for Olt Scornicești.

Career statistics

Club

International

Honours
Steaua București
Liga I: 2013–14
Cupa României: 2010–11; runner-up: 2013–14
Supercupa României: 2013; runner-up: 2011

Pandurii Târgu Jiu
Cupa Ligii runner-up: 2014–15

Lech Poznań
Polish Cup runner-up: 2016–17

Astra Giurgiu
Cupa României runner-up: 2020–21

References

External links

1990 births
Living people
Sportspeople from Slatina, Romania
Romanian footballers
Association football midfielders
Liga I players
Liga II players
UAE Pro League players
Cypriot First Division players
Ekstraklasa players
FC Internațional Curtea de Argeș players
FC Steaua București players
CS Pandurii Târgu Jiu players
Hatta Club players
Lech Poznań players
FC Astra Giurgiu players
Aris Limassol FC players
FC Voluntari players
Romania youth international footballers
Romania under-21 international footballers
Romania international footballers
Romanian expatriate footballers
Expatriate footballers in Portugal
Romanian expatriate sportspeople in Portugal
Expatriate footballers in Poland
Expatriate footballers in the United Arab Emirates
Expatriate footballers in Cyprus
Romanian expatriate sportspeople in Poland